Charles Jurine (1751–1819) was a Swiss zoologist who, inspired by a letter by Lazzaro Spallanzani to the Geneva Natural History Society, set about showing that bats used their ears to navigate. He corresponded with Spallanzani, who confirmed his findings but their work was largely ignored until the 20th century when Donald Griffin and G. W. Pierce proposed echolocation.

Notes 
Griffin, D.R. (1986). Listening in the Dark. Cornell University Press, Ithaca
Houston, R., Parsons, S., Jones, G., and Bennett, A. (2001). Biosonar: Seeing with Sound. www.biosonar.bris.ac.uk (2001).
Pollak, G.D. and Casseday, J.H. (1989). The Neural Basis of Echolocation in Bats. Springer-Verlag, Berlin
Thomas, J.A., Moss, C.F., and Vater, M. (2004). In: Echolocation in Bats and Dolphins. (2004). The University of Chicago Press, Chicago
Jones, K., Jones, G, and Waters, D. (2018) "Echolocation". https://www.bbc.co.uk/sounds/play/b0b6hrl3?partner=uk.co.bbc&origin=share-mobile

1751 births
1819 deaths
19th-century Swiss zoologists
18th-century Swiss zoologists